The Claim of Right (c. 28) is an Act passed by the Convention of the Estates, a sister body to the Parliament of Scotland (or Three Estates), in April 1689. It is one of the key documents of United Kingdom constitutional law and Scottish constitutional law.

Background
In the Glorious Revolution, William of Orange landed with his army in England on 5 November 1688. King James VII of Scotland, who was also King of England and Ireland as James II, attempted to resist the invasion. He then sent representatives to negotiate, and he finally fled England on 23 December 1688.

Whilst the Convention Parliament in England declared that James, as King of England, had abdicated the Government, and issued an English Bill of Rights on 13 February 1689 offering the Crown of England to William and Mary, the Scots found themselves facing a more difficult constitutional problem. As James had not been present in Scotland during the crisis and had not fled from Scottish territory in December, it would be highly dubious to claim that he had  the Scottish throne.

Process
Therefore, a Convention of the Scottish Estates met to consider letters received on 16 March 1689 from the two contenders for the Crown. On 4 April they voted to remove James VII from office, drawing on George Buchanan's argument on the contractual nature of monarchy.

Later that month, the Convention adopted the Claim of Right and the Article of Grievances, enumerating what they saw as the contemporary requirements of Scottish constitutional law. It also declared that, because of his actions in violation of these laws, James had forfeited the Scottish throne.

The Convention proceeded to offer the crown on the basis of these documents to William and Mary, who accepted it on 11 May 1689, and were proclaimed King and Queen of the Scots as William II and Mary II, though with subsequent controversy over whether the Claim of Right articles against Episcopacy were fully accepted by the new monarchy.

Provisions of the Act 
The Act includes the passage:

Significance 
The effect of the Claim of Right was to "bolster the position of parliament within the Scottish constitution at the expense of the royal prerogative". It was affirmed by an Act of the Scottish Parliament of 1703 (Act Ratifieing the turning of the Meeting of the Estates in the year 1689, into a Parliament c. 3). The Act was retained by the Parliament of the United Kingdom after the Acts of Union 1707.

In 2019, the Act was cited by MPs seeking a court ruling that Prime Minister Boris Johnson's September 2019 prorogation of Parliament was unlawful. The Court of Session Outer House judge, Lord Doherty found the claim was non-justiciable, and that if it was justiciable then there was no breach of the Claim of Right. The Inner House allowed the appeal, ruling the issue justiciable and the prorogation unlawful, since its true purpose was to "stymie Parliamentary scrutiny of government action". However, it said this was not a consequence of peculiarities of Scots law or the Claim of Right.

References

External links

1689 in law
1689 in Scotland
Acts of the Parliament of Scotland
Constitutional laws of Scotland
Succession to the British crown
Glorious Revolution